Nazir Leghari (born 11 November 1955) Nazir Leghari is a fearless, humble and thorough professional. He received his LLB degree from Federal Urdu University of Arts and Sciences, Karachi and then began working for the daily, Nawa-e-Waqt, in 1981 where he was in-charge of its political desk. He joined the daily Jang, in 1985 and became the newspaper’s Magazine Editor in 1989. In 1990 he became Assistant Editor – News, with Jang and rose through the ranks to become Editor of daily Awam in 1994. In 2006, he switched to Jang again, where he was appointed as Editor. In addition, he has authored multiple books.
He regularly features on a number of talk shows and is widely appreciated for his balanced and rational views.

Currently he is the host of BOL News Program “Ek Leghari Sab Pe Bhaari”

Early life and career
Nazir Leghari was born in Jampur, Punjab, Pakistan. He came to Karachi as a young boy and finished his basic education in that city. He further went on to receive his law degree from the University of Karachi.
Leghari is also the author of seven books, Siyaasat e Douraan, Seenay Jhokan Deedain Deray , based on his visits to Saudi Arabia, Egypt and the UK, Tareekh Bolti Hai comprising his interviews and meetings with more than 15 world leaders and his book Arz-e-Haal.His Book "Tarikh Saz Log" is comprised on detail meetings and interviews of leading politicians of Pakistan, "Tarikhi Khatoot" is comprised on personal and official letters of the most influential people of the history. His book "Sehra ka Raqs" is based on translation of feminine Arabic poetry.

Leghari is also a veteran newspaper columnist.
	
On 23 March 2014, Nazir Leghari received President of Pakistan's Award for Pride of Performance.

In January 2015, Nazir Leghari joined BOL Media Group as Senior Executive Vice President and Editor Urdu Daily of BOL News.

Early life and education
Nazir Leghari was born on 11 November 1955 in Jampur, Punjab, Pakistan. He came to Karachi as a young boy and finished his basic education in that city.  He further went on to do L.L.B from Karachi University.

Nazir Leghari joined Daily Nawa e Waqt in 1981.

He joined Daily Jang in 1985 as In-charge London desk. In 1986 he took charge of political edition. In 1987 he took charge of editorial page of Daily Jang. In 1989 he became magazine editor of Daily Jang. In 1990 he was assigned as Assistant Editor (news) Daily Jang.

In 1990, he started writing a column called Karachi Diary in the Urdu language weekly Akhbar-e-Jahan.

In 1993, he established a newspaper Daily Public along with Anwar Sen Roy as its editor. He was the News Editor and chief reporter of Daily Public.

In August 1994, Nazir Leghari joined the newspaper Daily Awam as Editor. 
In 2006, he started writing a column in Daily Jang on a regular basis.
In 2008, he was appointed to work as member of Editorial Committee of Geo News along with his other responsibilities.
In 2012, he was appointed as the Editor of Daily Jang, the largest circulating newspaper of Pakistan.

In January 2015, he left Jang Group and joined BOL Media Group as Senior Executive Vice President and is currently working there.

In October 2016, he became the 'President and Editor-in-Chief' of BOL Media Group.
He is also currently doing his show "eik Leghari Sab pe Bhari" on 5pm on every Saturday and Sunday . This show replaced the old show 'Top Five Breaking' and "Ab bat Hogi which were aired on Bol News channel from December 2016 till 2019.

Author 
Nazir Leghari is the author of nine books:
 Siyaasat e Douraan "Tarikh Saz Log", "Tareekhi, Khatoot:" Sehra Ka Raqs"
 Seenay Jhokan Deedain Deray, based on his visits to Saudi Arabia, Egypt and UK.
 Tareekh Bolti Hai comprising the interviews and meetings with, more than 15 persons including World leaders. The interviewees include Benazir Bhutto, King Fahd Bin Abdul Aziz, Mullah Mohammed Omar, Chandrika Kumaratunga, Sheikh Hasina, V. P. Singh, Ahmad Shah Massoud, Man Mohan Adhikari, Tony Benn, Andy Brooks, David Anderson, Gulbuddin Hekmatyar, Mohammad Yunus Khalis, Anura Bandaranaike and Commander Engineer Faiz Mohammad Mengal. The main topics of the interviews were Islam, Democracy, Communism and liberalism with special perspective of South Asia, Central Asia, Middle East and Europe.
 Arz-e-Haal –his book was comprised on his selected columns.
In 2017 his another book Tarikh Saz Log published, which was comprised on interviews and meetings of most important political figures of Pakistan including Zulfikar Ali Bhutto, Begum Nusrat Bhutto, Benazir Bhutto,  Khan Abdul Wali Khan, Mir Ghaus Bakhsh Bizanjo, Mian Mumtaz Mohammad Daulatana, Ghulam Mustafa Jatoi, G M Syed, Nawab Akbar Bugti, Rasool Bakhsh Palijo, Hanif Ramey, S M Zafar, Malik Meraj Khalid, Justice Yaqoob Ali Khan, Justice Durab Patel, Justice Anwaar UL Haque, Justice Fakharuddin G ibrahim, Mian Tufail Mohammad, Maulana Shah Ahmed Noorani, Maulana Shah Mohammad Amroti, Syed Alam Shah, Meraj Mohammad Khan, Fatehyab Ali Khan, Shah Mohammad Shah, Zaman Jafari, Khuaja Khairuddin, Malik Mohammad Qasim, Sardar Shaukat Ali, Dr Mubbashir Hassan, Khan of Qalat Mir Daud Jan, Nawabzada Nusarullah Khan, Air Marshal (R) Asghar Khan, Nawaz Sharif, Jam Saqi, Sardar Abdul Qayyum Khan, Abdul Hafeez Pirzada, Maulana Fazal Ur Rahman, K H Khursheed Musheer Ahmed Pesh Imam, Islamuddin Shaikh, Maulana Abdul Sattar Niazi, Shah Fareed Ul  Haque, Mumtaz Ali Bhutto and Mir  Hazar Khan Bijarani, This book was published by Fiction House Mazang Road Lahore.
In 2019 his two books "Tarikhi Khatoot" and "Sehra ka Raqs" were published. Tarikhi Khatoot was comprised on the personal letters of the most influential people of the history. In their personal letters those important and influential people described themselves as very common and very ordinary. 

Some letters are really inspiring and emotional. Specially the 1st letter of this book was written by Chief Sealth, the chief of Read Indian Duwamish tribe. He pursued a path of accommodation to white settlers but his reluctance and reservations will always be considered the statement of the natives. Another letter of best comedian and legend of the cinema Charlie Chaplin to his daughter Geraldine will always be considered one of the best letters of the world. Likewise a letter of NInoy Aquino a hero of the Philippine to his son Noynoy Aquino will be considered an asset for those people who are struggling for democracy, democratic values and civil liberties. 

In this book Nazir Leghari included the personal letters of Voltaire, Sigmund Freud, Che Guevara, Abraham Lincoln, Adolf Hitler, King Henry 8th of England, Napoleon Bonaparte, Alexander the Great, Queen Marie Antoinette, Immanuel Kant, John Adams, Jacqueline Kennedy, Marilyn Monroe, Princess Diana, Ninoy Aquino, Grigori Rasputin, Zhou Enlai, Nelson Mandela, Queen Mary Stuart of Scotland, Richard Nixon, Simon Bolivar, Gabriel Garcia Marquez, Fidel Castro, Fredrick Neitzsche, John Keats, Jean Austen, Jenni Marx, Maria Celeste daughter of Galilei Galileo, Martin Heidegger, Herbert Marcuse, Ludwig van Beethoven, Ho Chi Minh, Pablo Neruda, Rosa Luxemburg, Charlie Chaplin, Saddam Hussein, Mahmood Darwesh, Comrade Prachanda, Qurat Ul Ain Haider, Quaid Azam Mohammad Ali Jinnah, Bhagat Singh, Bacha Khan, Allama Dr Iqbal, Sardar Abdul Rab Nishtar, Rasool Bakhsh Palijo, Yasir Arfat, Sharif of Mecca, Mao Zedong, Anwar Sadat, Queen Farah Pehlvi, Imam Khumanie, Prince Charles, Émile Zola, Shaikh Ayaz and Friedrich Hegal. Nazir Leghari not only researched and compiled the historical letters but he also gave an introduction of all those influential and important personalities. 
In same year 2019 Nazir Leghari brought his another book "Sehra ka Raqs". This book is the selection of the feminine Arabic Poetry. He translated the poetry of women Arab Poetesses included Fariha Bint Shadad, Alkhnsa, Rabea Baseri,Princess Walada bint Almustakafi,Fidwa Touqan, Nazik al Malaika, Etal Adnan, Salma Hijra Jayyousi, Naomi Shihab Nye, Fatiha Murshid, Maram al Masri, Fatimah Naut, Dunya Mikhail, Deema Shehabi, Nimah Ismail Nawwab, Hissa Hilal, Suheir Hammad, Rafeef Ziadah, Ayat Ayat ul Qurmazi and Shaikha al Mutairi. This book was highly appreciated in Urdu literary circles. He translated the poetry and also included the introduction of these women poetesses.
In 2021 his Saraiki Novel "Wisakh" published by famous publisher Fiction House Lahore, same year his new book "Walo Watanen" published by same publishers. This book was the Saraiki translation of AIME CESAIRE's long poem NOTEBOOK OF A RETURN TO THE NATIVE LAND.

Notable work and credits 
He interviewed many politicians during historic movement of MRD. He interviewed Agha Saddaruddin Durrani (former Speaker Sindh Assembly), Abdul Hafeez Lakho (council for Mr Zulfikar Ali Bhutto in Supreme Court) Mir Hazar Khjan Bijarani, President PPP Sindh, Syed Saeed Hassan (former MPA Sindh), Justice Shafi Mohammadi, Hakim Ali Zardari (father of Asif Ali Zardari) and many others. He wrote 80 biographical episodes of G Allana, (1st mayor of Karachi after independence, close relative to founder of Nation Quaid e Azam Mohammnad Ali Jinnah and a renowned English poet).

In 1987-8 he interviewed for weekly Akhbar e Jahan more than 50 Pakistani politicians including Benazir Bhutto, Khan Abdul Wali Khan, Mir Ghaus Bakhsh Bizanjo, Mian Mumtaz Mohammad Khan Doultana, Fazal Rahu, G M Syed, Malik Meraj Khalid, Meraj Mohammad Khan, Dr Mubbashir Hassan, Sardar Shaukat Ali, Jam Saqi, Syed Alam Shah, Nawabzada Nasarullah Khan, Maulana Fazal Ur Rehman, Maulana Shah Ahmed Noorani, Shah Farid ul Haque, Abdul Hafiz Pirzada, Mumtaz Ali Bhutto, Ghulam Mustafa Jatoi, Sardar Sher Baz Khan Mazari, Nawab Akbar Khan Bugti, Prince Mohiuddin Baloch, Justice S Anwar ul Haque, Justice Dorab Patel, Justice Fakharuddin G Ibrahim, Justice Yaqoob Khan, Hanif Ramay, Malik Qasim, Khawaja Khairuddin, Fatehyab Ali Khan, Maulana Shah Mohammad Amroti and many others.

Awards and honors 
Pride of Performance Award by the President of Pakistan in 2014.

References

1955 births
Living people
Pakistani male journalists
Pakistani newspaper editors
Pakistani columnists
Baloch people
People from Rajanpur District
Journalists from Karachi
University of Karachi alumni
BOL Network people
Recipients of the Pride of Performance